Qezel Kand (also known as Ghezel Kand) is a village in Shenetal Rural District, Kuhsar District, Salmas County, West Azerbaijan Province, Iran. At the 2006 census, its population was 489, in 93 families.

References 

Populated places in Salmas County